"Life on Mars?" is a song by the English singer-songwriter David Bowie, from his 1971 album Hunky Dory. Written as a parody of Frank Sinatra's "My Way", it was recorded on 6 August 1971 at Trident Studios in London. Co-produced by Bowie and Ken Scott, the backing band consisted of guitarist and string arranger Mick Ronson, bassist Trevor Bolder and drummer Mick Woodmansey; Strawbs member Rick Wakeman played piano. Primarily a glam rock ballad, with elements of cabaret and art rock, the song has a complex structure, containing different chord changes throughout. Lyrically, it describes a girl who goes to the cinema to escape reality, using surreal images, thematically reflecting optimism and the effects of Hollywood.

At the height of Bowie's fame as Ziggy Stardust, RCA Records issued "Life on Mars?" as a single on 22 June 1973 in the United Kingdom, where it peaked at number three. The single was promoted by a video shot by photographer Mick Rock, featuring a made-up Bowie in a turquoise suit singing the song against a white backdrop. Frequently performed by Bowie during his concerts, the song has appeared on numerous compilation albums and was remixed by Scott in 2003 and 2016, the latter being a 'stripped down' mix.

"Life on Mars?" is considered by commentators as one of Bowie's greatest songs, and of all time. Praise is given to Bowie's vocal performance and growth as a songwriter. The song was the namesake of the British television series Life on Mars and has featured in other films and television shows. Artists who have covered the song include Barbra Streisand and Nine Inch Nails members Trent Reznor and Atticus Ross. The song charted worldwide following Bowie's death in 2016 and became a frequent tribute song for the artist.

Background and writing

In early 1968, David Bowie's publisher, David Platz, was sharing a London office with another music publisher, Geoffrey Heath. One day, Heath brought in an acetate of the 1967 French song "Comme d'habitude", composed by Claude François and Jacques Revaux, and sung by François. Having a limited option for the song's British rights, Heath requested Platz for a songwriter to write English lyrics for the song. Platz suggested Bowie, who at that point had done other translations for him. Bowie's then-manager, Kenneth Pitt, believed that Bowie was a stronger lyricist than a composer and if he wrote "to a strong melody composed by someone else," it would guarantee him a hit. Bowie's translation, titled "Even a Fool Learns to Love", took influence from his then-recent work as a mime and featured a reference to his 1967 track "When I Live My Dream". He later told Michael Parkinson in a 2002 interview that he "wrote some really terrible lyrics [to it]".

Although Bowie recorded an unreleased demo in February 1968, the French publishers of "Comme d'habitude" rejected him, primarily due to his obscurity. Soon after, songwriter Paul Anka bought the rights to "Comme d'habitude" and rewrote it into "My Way", a song made famous by American singer Frank Sinatra in 1969. The success of "My Way" prompted Bowie to write "Life on Mars?" as a parody of Sinatra's recording. He told Parkinson: "That really made me angry for so long—for about a year... eventually I thought, 'I can write something as big as that, and I'll write one that sounds a bit like it. Bowie acknowledged the song's influence in the liner notes for Hunky Dory, which state that the song was "inspired by Frankie".

Using "My Way" as a basis, Bowie wrote "Life on Mars?" relatively quickly. He later recalled in the liner notes for the 2008 compilation iSelect that he began humming the melody in a park in Beckenham, Kent, thereafter returning home to Haddon Hall and writing the rest of the song that afternoon on piano, which he primarily used to compose other songs of this period. Bowie believed that using "Comme d'habitude" as a basis was not "theft", but rather "a statement of rightful ownership". One Melody Maker reviewer suggested the song was written after "a brief and painful affair" with actress Hermione Farthingale. While on tour in 1990, Bowie introduced the song by saying "You fall in love, you write a love song. This is a love song." Despite writing it quickly, Bowie's original handwritten lyrics were vastly different—save for the chorus—than the finished recording, being more akin to the tone of Hunky Dorys other Nietzsche-inspired numbers: "There's a shoulder-rock movement and the trembling starts / And a great Lord signs in vain / What can you buy when there's no-one to tell you / What a bargain you made..."

Recording

Early demo
Bowie recorded a demo of "Life on Mars?" between May and June 1971. According to biographer Nicholas Pegg, the demo runs at a short length of 1:53 and features Bowie alone on vocals and piano. Lyrically, it only contains the first verse and chorus, and featured several lyrical variations from the finished track, including "It's a simple but small affair", "Her mother is yelling no, and her father has asked her to go" and "It's a time for the lawman beating up the wrong guy". The demo remains unreleased. According to biographer Marc Spitz, Bowie had recorded demos of "Life on Mars?" and other Hunky Dory tracks "Oh! You Pretty Things" and "Andy Warhol" around this time, which inspired Bowie's new manager, Tony Defries, to look into securing a new record contract for Bowie, eventually signing him with RCA Records.

Studio version

Work on Hunky Dory officially began at Trident Studios in London on 8 June 1971. "Life on Mars?" was recorded on the final day of the sessions, 6 August. According to O'Leary, Bowie and co-producer Ken Scott considered the track to be "the Big One" and saved it for the end. Earlier in July, Defries sent a letter to jazz pianist Dudley Moore asking him to play piano during a session. There is no known evidence that Moore replied and although the specific song Defries was asking him to play on is unknown, biographer Kevin Cann deduces that it was most likely "Life on Mars?". In the end, piano was played by keyboardist Rick Wakeman, noted session musician and member of the Strawbs, who previously played Mellotron on Bowie's 1969 self-titled album. In 1995 he recalled that he met with Bowie in late June 1971 at Haddon Hall, where he heard demos of "Changes" and "Life on Mars?" in "their raw brilliance ... the finest selection of songs I have ever heard in one sitting in my entire life ... I couldn't wait to get into the studio and record them." The piano Wakeman played was the same 1898 Bechstein used by the Beatles for "Hey Jude" and later by Queen for "Bohemian Rhapsody".

Along with Wakeman on piano, the backing band consisted of guitarist Mick Ronson, bassist Trevor Bolder and drummer Mick Woodmansey. Ronson also composed the song's string arrangement which, according to Woodmansey, was the first he had ever undertaken: "He was very nervous about it. We had a whole string section at Trident with the proper BBC session players who, if one note was not written properly, would turn their noses up and you wouldn't get a good sound out of them. So Mick was really nervous, but when they played the parts they realized these rock'n'rollers might not be guys we want to be in the studio with, but the parts are good. They took it on and really went with it." Ronson's wife Suzi recalled that he composed the arrangement while sitting in the studio restroom. Additionally, Woodmansey told NME in 2016 that "Life on Mars?" was the first time he realised the "calibre" of Bowie's songwriting, saying "It had just gone to another level of quality... it was something really special." He also noted that it was a bit scary because there was nothing around like that [at the time]." Bowie recorded his vocal performance in one take. Regarding Bowie's talent as a vocalist, Scott stated: "He was unique. [He was] the only singer I ever worked with where virtually every take was a master."

Composition

Music

"Life on Mars?" is described by biographer David Buckley as a "soaring, cinematic ballad". Musically, the song has been classified as glam rock, while Michael Gallucci of Ultimate Classic Rock finds the melody "bridges cabaret and art rock". The song features a complex structure: the verses are primarily in the key of F major, but different chord changes are present throughout, including C7 ("told her to go"), F ("but her friend"), and later on, C9 to A ("lived it ten times"). The pre-chorus sections go from F major to B major, which is dominant throughout the choruses; Bolder's bassline features a rising chromatic scale of E to E to F to G. Bowie delivers his vocals passionately during the choruses and almost nasally in the verses.

The song begins with a single piano note, followed by a rest, with Bowie beginning his vocals on the third beat. The same chord sequence for "My Way" is used for the opening bars of "Life on Mars?". Bolder enters on bass at the line "sunken dream". At the pre-chorus, the instruments begin to build: strings and bass crash on the downbeat, Wakeman continues a run of chords on piano, while Bowie's voice grows in intensity, changing from D to B ("focus on/SAI-LORS"). He weakens his B note briefly for "OH man" before changing from E to B on "law-man". The final climax arrives at the word "Mars", a B note which he holds for three bars. Afterwards, another sequence plays out before the next verse begins.

Ronson based his string arrangement on the bassline Bolder worked on during rehearsals for the track. The other instruments act as a counterpoint to the strings during the chorus: on drums, Woodmansey plays, in O'Leary's words, a "snare-medium tom fill to echo a descending violin line", while Wakeman adds "dancing" replies on piano. Ronson plays the recorder during the second verse at the "Ibiza" line. Bowie noted that Wakeman "embellished the piano part" of his original melody and Ronson "created one of his first and best string parts" for the song. Author Peter Doggett describes Ronson's string arrangement as "gargantuan", and Sandford argues that the "lush, orchestral arrangement" of the track is what Hunky Dory would be best remembered for.

Towards the end, after Ronson gives a short, "vibrato-saturated" guitar solo—recorded in one take—the strings play "grand sweeps" before a climactic tom-roll. Doggett and O'Leary compare the tom-roll to the timpani from 2001: A Space Odyssey (1968), while Pegg and Christopher Sandford compare it to the poem Also sprach Zarathustra. After a false ending, Wakeman's piano plays the chorus melody "off in the distance". Then, in O'Leary's words, "a phone rings, the song's manufacturers grumble, we're left awake and alone." According to Pegg, the phone ring occurred during an earlier, scrapped take at the end of the tape, which Bowie decided to keep for the final mix.

Lyrics
BBC Radio 2 describes "Life on Mars?" as having "one of the strangest lyrics ever", consisting of a "slew of surreal images" like a Salvador Dalí painting. Spitz sees a theme of optimism, in the song. A "girl with mousy hair" looks to the cinema as a way to escape from reality. Sandford writes that it "sets up a complex parallel world in which the cinema becomes life." After the girl becomes "hooked to the silver screen", Bowie uses an array of images one might see when viewing films from different decades, naming the likes of Mickey Mouse, John Lennon, "Rule, Britannia!", Ibiza and the Norfolk Broads.

At the time of Hunky Dorys release in 1971, Bowie summed up the song as "A sensitive young girl's reaction to the media." In 1997, he added: "I think she finds herself disappointed with reality... that although she's living in the doldrums of reality, she's being told that there's a far greater life somewhere, and she's bitterly disappointed that she doesn't have access to it." Doggett writes that a key motif throughout the song is Hollywood, which he describes as "a manufacturer of dreams and stars that have become stale with repetition." This is evident in the line "the film is a saddening bore—she's lived it ten times or more", which Sandford calls "a neat, if well-worn trick, blurring the art-life divide." The Hollywood influence is also present in the line "look at those cavemen go", which is borrowed from the song "Alley Oop", a one-off 1960 hit by the American doo-wop band the Hollywood Argyles.

The identity of the "girl with the mousy hair" has been debated. Some journalists and commentators have suggested the girl is Farthingale. However, Pegg disagrees, writing that there is no evidence to support this claim. Farthingale herself has rejected this theory, telling Pegg: "I don't actually have mousy hair... I wasn't a person who lived at home with my parents, and I didn't live a fantasy life in films. Nothing about me fits into any of the words."

Title
Although Bowie was fixated on becoming Ziggy Stardust at the time of its recording, the song has no connection to Mars itself; the title was a reference to the recent media frenzy of the US and Soviet Union racing to get to the red planet. Doggett states that the media frenzy sparked headlines around the world that asked the question: "Is there life on Mars?" Nevertheless, Perone opines that the science fiction-influenced character of Ziggy Stardust and his backing band the Spiders from Mars originated from the "fleeting image" of "Life on Mars?", as well as the "androgynous outcast" that was portrayed in The Man Who Sold the World (1970).

Release
RCA Records released Hunky Dory on 17 December 1971, with "Life on Mars?" sequenced as the fourth track on side one of the original LP, between "Eight Line Poem" and "Kooks". Eighteen months later, at the height of Bowie's Ziggy Stardust fame, RCA belatedly released the track as a single in the UK on 22 June 1973, with the catalogue number RCA 2316 and the 1970 track "The Man Who Sold the World" as the B-side. Cann writes that its release as a single was due to its "strong reception" on the Ziggy Stardust Tour. RCA had previously reissued "Space Oddity" as a single in the US in December 1972.

Shortly before its release as a single, a new promotional video for "Life on Mars?" was shot at the Blandford West Ten Studio in Ladbroke Grove, West London, on 13 June 1973. Directed and shot by photographer Mick Rock, who previously directed the videos for "John, I'm Only Dancing" and "The Jean Genie", it features a heavily made-up Bowie miming to the song solo against a white backdrop, wearing in a turquoise suit designed by Freddie Buretti. Rock later explained that "it wasn't so much an idea as a moment in time," clarifying that he "wanted to do something that looked a little bit like a painting." Bowie later remarked that the final result has a "strange floaty, pop-art effect." In 2016, it was remastered and reedited by Rock.

"Life on Mars?" has been released on a variety of compilation albums, including The Best of Bowie (1980) (featuring a different edit), Changesbowie (EMI LP and cassette versions) (1990), The Singles Collection (1993), The Best of David Bowie 1969/1974 (1997), Best of Bowie (2002), and iSelect (2008). Scott remixed the track in 2003, which appears on Nothing Has Changed (2014). In 2015, the song, along with its parent album, was remastered for the Five Years (1969–1973) box set. It was released in CD, vinyl, and digital formats. Following Bowie's death in 2016, a new mix of "Life on Mars?" was released for the Legacy (The Very Best of David Bowie) compilation and also as a single. The mix, by Scott, is 'stripped down' and has only strings, piano and Bowie's vocals.

Critical reception

Hunky Dory was met with very positive reviews from several British and American publications. Classifying it under their "Top Album Picks", Billboard named "Life on Mars?" as one of the strongest songs from the album. Reviewers have generally considered "Life on Mars?" one of the best tracks on Hunky Dory. Gallucci argues that "Life on Mars?" is one of the tracks that "painted a portrait of an artist who couldn't be labelled because he himself had little idea of who or what he was at the time". Dave Thompson of AllMusic describes it as "a masterpiece of fragmented thought and displaced vision" and one of Bowie's "most astonishing" songs. Other reviewers have classified the track as giving a strong representation of Bowie's growth as a songwriter. On the eve of the song's 50th anniversary in 2021, Matt Neal of ABC News writes that "the song stands as an epitaph to [a] remarkable musician".

Retrospectively, reviewers and commentators have praised "Life on Mars?" as one of Bowie's finest songs. Pegg calls it his "1971 masterpiece", while O'Leary considers it to be "the Citizen Kane of Bowie's songs: young man's bravura". Doggett and Rob Sheffield consider Bowie's vocal performance to be one of his best. Meanwhile, Spitz describes it as "one of the best pop songs ever written". Publications including Digital Spy, Mojo, and Consequence of Sound have considered it Bowie's greatest song. Digital Spy stated it has "perhaps become [Bowie's] signature song—filled with surreal cut-up lyrics..., it married vivid imagery with a tender, heartbreaking melody". In 2008, Uncut magazine ranked it number nine in a list of Bowie's 30 best songs. Following Bowie's death, Rolling Stone named "Life on Mars?" one of the 30 most essential songs of Bowie's catalogue. Two years later in 2018, the readers of NME voted the song as Bowie's second best track, behind "All the Young Dudes", while the publication's staff placed it at number seven in a list of Bowie's 40 best songs. In The Guardian, Alexis Petridis voted it number four in his list of Bowie's 50 greatest songs, calling it a "no-further-questions masterpiece". Meanwhile, the staff of The Telegraph listed it as one of Bowie's 20 essential songs in 2021. In a list ranking every Bowie single from worst to best, Ultimate Classic Rock placed "Life on Mars?" at number six. In 2020, Tom Eames of Smooth Radio listed it as Bowie's second greatest song, behind "Heroes".

Accolades
"Life on Mars?" has appeared on numerous best-of lists. Neil McCormick, chief rock critic of The Telegraph, has ranked "Life on Mars?" the greatest song of all time in two different lists compiling the 100 Greatest Songs of All Time. He described it in the first list thus:

In 2007, Q magazine ranked "Life on Mars?" third in a list compiling the "10 most perfect songs ever", behind Jeff Buckley's version of "Hallelujah" and the Beatles' "Strawberry Fields Forever". The song has also appeared in lists of the best songs of the 1970s, including at number 25 by NME, and number one by Pitchfork and Treble. In 2021, Rolling Stone magazine ranked it number 105 in their updated list of the 500 Greatest Songs of All Time.

Commercial performance
Upon release as a single, "Life on Mars?" entered the UK Singles Chart at number 21, peaking at number three in mid-July, being held off the top spot by "Welcome Home" by Peters and Lee and "I'm the Leader of the Gang (I Am)" by Gary Glitter. It remained on the chart for a total of thirteen weeks. It also managed to peak at number 39 on the Official German Charts in West Germany. In the wake of the massive commercial success of Bowie's 1983 album Let's Dance, "Life on Mars?" returned to the UK chart for one week, peaking at number 97.

Over 30 years later after its initial release, the song re-entered the UK singles chart at number 55 in April 2007, largely because of its use in the British television series Life on Mars. It also charted at number 67 two years later on the Australian ARIA charts. Following Bowie's death in 2016, "Life on Mars?" charted around the world. It became a top-five hit in both France and Ireland, and in the US, it peaked at number seven and twelve on Billboards Euro Digital Song Sales and Hot Rock & Alternative Songs charts, respectively. Elsewhere, the song charted in Finland (12), Italy (33), Belgium Wallonia (40), Sweden (44), Switzerland (48), Portugal (63), and the Netherlands (95).

Live performances
Bowie performed "Life on Mars?" frequently throughout his concert tours. Live recordings from 1972, recorded on the Ziggy Stardust tour, have appeared on the 2003 30th-anniversary bonus disc of Aladdin Sane and on the bootleg album Santa Monica '72 (1994), which received an official release as Live Santa Monica '72 in 2008. On the 1973 leg of the Ziggy Stardust Tour, the song was performed in a medley with "Quicksand" and "Memory of a Free Festival". Additionally, a live performance recorded during the 1976 Isolar Tour on 23 March 1976, in a medley with "Five Years", was included on Live Nassau Coliseum '76, which has been released as part of the 2010 reissues of Station to Station, in the 2016 box set Who Can I Be Now? (1974–1976), and as a stand-alone album in 2017. Bowie also performed the song on The Tonight Show Starring Johnny Carson on 5 September 1980.

A performance from the Serious Moonlight Tour, recorded on 12 September 1983, may be heard on the live album Serious Moonlight (Live '83), which was initially released as part of the 2018 box set Loving the Alien (1983–1988) and separately the following year. The filmed performance also appears on the concert video Serious Moonlight (1984). After the Sound+Vision Tour in 1990, Bowie did not perform "Life on Mars?" again until 23 August 1999 for a recorded-for-television performance, later released on VH1 Storytellers in 2009. A year later, Bowie performed the song at the Glastonbury Festival on 25 June 2000, later released in 2018 on Glastonbury 2000. The song was also a mainstay during the Hours, 2000 and Heathen tours, while a November 2003 performance from his final A Reality Tour was released on the A Reality Tour DVD in 2004 and subsequently included on the A Reality Tour album in 2010. Bowie's final performance of "Life on Mars?" was on 8 September 2005, when he performed it with the indie rock band Arcade Fire at Radio City Music Hall in New York City at that year's Fashion Rocks event. Bowie was introduced by singer Alicia Keys and was accompanied by his longtime pianist Mike Garson. A recording was subsequently released via iTunes.

Cover versions and appearances in media

"Life on Mars?" has appeared in numerous television series. The British television series Life on Mars was named after and heavily featured the song, subsequently appearing on its soundtrack album. Meanwhile, actress Jessica Lange sang a rendition with a deep German accent on the fourth-season premiere of the FX television series American Horror Story: Freak Show. Playing a character whose surname is Mars, Lange wears an ice-blue trouser suit and heavy matching eye shadow in her performance, echoing the Bowie video. The Doctor Who episode "The Waters of Mars" (2009) takes place in the first human base on Mars, which is named "Bowie Base One", acknowledged by showrunner Russell T Davies as a reference to "Life on Mars?".

The song has also appeared in several film soundtracks. The original soundtrack of the 1996 film Breaking the Waves features "Life on Mars?" during the epilogue, although the song was replaced by Elton John's "Your Song" on the international DVD release for copyright reasons. Seu Jorge recorded a Portuguese cover for the 2004 film The Life Aquatic with Steve Zissou, while Bowie's original is included on the film's soundtrack album. "Life on Mars?" also appears in Loverboy (2005) and Hunky Dory (2012), and on the soundtrack of Factory Girl (2006). The song also appears in the 2015 musical Lazarus, written by Bowie and playwright Enda Walsh near the end of Bowie's life. It is sung by the character of 'Girl', played by Sophia Anne Caruso in the New York and London productions. For the musical, the song's arrangement was downplayed in order to avoid it becoming a Broadway "showstopper". The song also features in the soundtrack to the first trailer for Paul Thomas Anderson's 2021 film Licorice Pizza, as well as appearing in the film itself.

A multitude of artists have covered "Life on Mars?". American singer Barbra Streisand covered the song for her 1974 album ButterFly. Bowie condemned it, saying in 1976 it was "[b]loody awful. Sorry, Barb, but it was atrocious." Pegg also panned a 2005 easy listening version by the British group G4 in his book The Complete David Bowie, calling it "heroically gruesome". ABBA member Anni-Frid Lyngstad recorded a Swedish version titled "Liv på Mars?" for her 1975 solo album Frida ensam, while a version by Belgian singer Jasper Steverlinck reached number one in the Belgian charts in 2003. In 2019, Nine Inch Nails members Trent Reznor and Atticus Ross covered the song on their soundtrack for the HBO limited series Watchmen. The dark ambient piano cover appears in the end credits of the episode "An Almost Religious Awe". Reznor, who was personal friends with Bowie, remarked that composing the cover was a daunting task, but that he and Ross were ultimately "very proud" of the result.

Following Bowie's death in 2016, "Life on Mars?" became one of his most widely selected songs for tribute performances. A version by Nicholas Freestone, organ scholar at St Albans Cathedral in Hertfordshire, became a viral hit after a video of his performance was posted on Facebook and YouTube. New Zealand singer-songwriter Lorde performed the song with Bowie's final touring band at the 2016 Brit Awards in February 2016. Her cover was widely acknowledged as one of the finest tribute performances to the artist. Later that year, the song was performed at the 2016 Royal Edinburgh Military Tattoo. "Life on Mars?" has also been used for various space-related events. In 2018, the song was played by the radio of Elon Musk's Tesla Roadster during its launch aboard the Falcon Heavy's maiden flight. A cover version by the English singer Yungblud was used at the end of NASA TV's live coverage of the landing of the Mars 2020 rover.

Personnel
According to biographer Chris O'Leary:
 David Bowie vocals
 Mick Ronson electric guitars, recorders, string arrangement
 Trevor Bolder bass guitar
 Mick Woodmansey drums
 Rick Wakeman piano
 Unknown musicians violins, violas, celli, string bassesProduction'
 David Bowie producer
 Ken Scott producer, engineer

Charts

Certifications

Notes

References

Sources

 
 
 
 
 
 
 
 
 

1970s ballads
1971 songs
1973 singles
Barbra Streisand songs
David Bowie songs
RCA Records singles
Rock ballads
Song recordings produced by David Bowie
Song recordings produced by Ken Scott
Songs about actors
Songs about the media
Songs written by David Bowie